The 2021 Brussels summit of the North Atlantic Treaty Organization (NATO) was the 31st formal meeting of the heads of state and heads of government of the North Atlantic Treaty Organization, held in Brussels, Belgium, on 14 June 2021.

It was the first time that North Macedonia attended the NATO Summit since joining NATO in 2020.

Member states leaders and other dignitaries in attendance

See also
 47th G7 summit

References

2021 conferences
2021 in Brussels
2021 in international relations
21st-century diplomatic conferences (NATO)
Belgium and NATO
Diplomatic conferences in Belgium
June 2021 events in Europe
NATO summits
June 2021 events in Belgium